Dream Stuff is a collection of short stories by the Australian writer David Malouf, published in 2000.

Contents 
 "At Schindler's"
 "Closer"
 "Blacksoil Country"
 "Jacko's Reach"
 "Lone Pine"
 "Night Training"
 "Sally's Story"
 "Great Day"

Australian short story collections
2000 short story collections
Chatto & Windus books